Viçosa is Portuguese-language placename:
Nova Viçosa, Bahia, Brazil
Viçosa, Alagoas, Brazil
Viçosa, Minas Gerais, Brazil
Viçosa, Rio Grande do Norte, Brazil
Viçosa do Ceará, Ceará, Brazil
Vila Viçosa, Portugal